The 1992 World Short Track Speed Skating Team Championships was the 2nd edition of the World Short Track Speed Skating Team Championships which took place on 14-15 March 1992 in Minamimaki, Japan.

Medal winners

Results

Men

Women

References

External links
 Results
 Results book

World Short Track Speed Skating Team Championships
1992 World Short Track Speed Skating Team Championships